Stephen Burns is an American musician.

Stephen or Steve Burns is also the name of:

 Stephen G. Burns, Chairman, Nuclear Regulatory Commission
 Stephen L. Burns, American author
 Stephen W. Burns (1954–1990), American actor
 Stephen Burns, chairman of Wheaton World Wide Moving
 Steve Burns (born 1973), American musician, actor, and former children's television show host
 Steve Burns (soccer), American soccer coach
 Steve Burns, founder and former CEO of Workhorse Group

See also
 Steve Byrnes (1959–2015), American television announcer
 Steve Byrne (born 1974), American comedian
 Stephen Byrne (disambiguation)
 Burns (surname)